José Gonçalo Ataíde Amaral Pedroso de Lima, better known as José Lima (born Coimbra, 24 April 1992), is a Portuguese rugby union player. He plays as a centre or as a wing.

Club career
Lima first played for CR Évora, moving afterwards to AEIS Agronomia, in Portugal, from 2010/11 to 2011/12. He was assigned to RC Narbonne, in the French Pro D2, when he was 20 years old, where he played from 2012/13 to 2013/14. He missed narrowly the promotion to the Top 14 at the final of the 2013/14 season. He moved to US Carcassonne for the next two seasons, 2014/15 to 2015/16, also at the Pro D2. He next played for US Oyonnax (2016/17-2017/18), once again for RC Narbonne (2017/18), moving for US Carcassonne in 2018/19, where he has been playing since then, still at the Pro D2. He was suspended for doping for one year in January 2019, returning to competition in January 2020.

International career
He has 40 caps for Portugal, since his debut in 2010, aged only 18 years old, with 5 tries, 1 conversion and 3 penalties scored, 36 points on aggregate. His first game was at the 17-22 loss to the United States, at 13 November 2010, in Lisbon. He has been a regular player for the national team since then.

References

1992 births
Living people
Portuguese rugby union players
Portugal international rugby union players
Rugby union centres
US Carcassonne players
RC Narbonne players
Oyonnax Rugby players
Sportspeople from Coimbra